Jannat is a 2017 Pakistani television drama series written by Bee Gul and first aired on 17 May 2017 on A-Plus TV. It features Anum Fayyaz, Affan Waheed, Azra Mansoor and Naeem Tahir in lead roles.

Cast 
 Anum Fayyaz as Zara
 Affan Waheed as Atif
 Azra Mansoor as Bi Jaan
 Naeem Tahir as Junaid's father
 Hina Rizvi as Atif's mother
 Khalid Bin Shaheen as Junaid
 Sonia Rao as Momi
 Rabya Kulsoom as Nadia

References 

Pakistani drama television series